Julie Gervais (born 22 June 1991) is a French tennis player.

Gervais has career-high WTA rankings of 374 in singles and 614 in doubles. So far, she has won three singles titles on tournaments of the ITF Women's Circuit.

Gervais made her WTA Tour main-draw debut at the 2022 Internationaux de Strasbourg, where she received entry into the singles draw as a qualified.

ITF Circuit finals

Singles: 5 (3 titles, 2 runner-ups)

References

External links
 
 

1991 births
Living people
French female tennis players